A State of Trance 2010 is the seventh compilation album in the A State of Trance compilation series mixed and compiled by Dutch DJ and record producer Armin van Buuren. It was released on 2 April 2010 by Armada Music and Avex Asia.

Track listing

Charts

Weekly charts

Year-end charts

Certifications

References

External links

Armin van Buuren compilation albums
Electronic compilation albums
2010 compilation albums